Janežovski Vrh is a settlement in the Municipality of Destrnik in northeastern Slovenia. The entire municipality is included in the Drava Statistical Region. The area is part of the traditional region of Styria.

References

External links
Janežovski Vrh on Geopedia

Populated places in the Municipality of Destrnik